William Millward (June 30, 1822 – November 28, 1871) was an Opposition Party and Republican member of the United States House of Representatives from Pennsylvania

Biography
Millward was born in the old district of Northern Liberties in Philadelphia, Pennsylvania.  He attended the public schools and was engaged in the manufacture of leather.

Career
Elected as an Opposition Party candidate to the Thirty-fourth Congress, Millward served as United States Representative for the third district of Pennsylvania from March 4, 1855, to March 4, 1857.  He was unsuccessful as the Unionist candidate for reelection in 1856, but was elected as a Republican to the Thirty-sixth Congress and served as U. S. Representative for the fourth district of Pennsylvania from March 4, 1859 to March 4, 1861. During that term, he was chairman of the United States House Committee on Patents.

Appointed by President Lincoln, Millward served as United States marshal for the eastern district of Pennsylvania from 1861 to 1865, confiscating and destroying Democratic newspapers from trains, post offices, and ships in port. When he was appointed Director of the United States Mint in September 1866, Millward's appointment was not confirmed by the United States Senate, so he served for only six months.

Death
Millward died in Kirkwood, Delaware, in 1871 and was interred at Laurel Hill Cemetery in Philadelphia.

References

External links

1822 births
1871 deaths
Politicians from Philadelphia
Opposition Party members of the United States House of Representatives from Pennsylvania
Pennsylvania Unionists
Republican Party members of the United States House of Representatives from Pennsylvania
Directors of the United States Mint
United States Marshals
Burials at Laurel Hill Cemetery (Philadelphia)
19th-century American politicians
Andrew Johnson administration personnel